The Moodswinger is a twelve-string electric zither with an additional third bridge designed by Yuri Landman. The rod which functions as the third bridge divides the strings into two sections to cause an overtone multiphonic sound. One of the copies of the instrument is part of the collection of the Musical Instrument Museum in Phoenix, Arizona.

History
In March 2006 Landman was contacted by the noise band Liars to make an instrument for them. After 6 months he finished two copies of The Moodswinger, an electric 12-string 3rd-bridge overtone koto, one for guitarist/drummer Aaron Hemphill and one for himself. Although it closely resembles an electric guitar, it is actually a zither, as it has neither frets nor a proper neck. The pickup and electronics are built into the neck instead of in the body like usual electric guitars. In 2008 the Moodswinger II was released as a serial product. Jessie Stein of The Luyas owns a copy. 

In 2009 Landman created a derivative version of the instrument called the Home Swinger, for workshops at festivals, where participants built their own copy within four hours. In 2010 the Musical Instrument Museum  in Phoenix included a Moodswinger as well as a Home Swinger in their collection as two of the pieces of the Dutch section of musical instrument inventions.

Physical background

The 3rd bridge divides the strings into two segments with different pitches. Depending on where the string is played, a bell-like harmonic second tone is created. The string resonates more or less when the back side is struck, depending on the position of the 3rd bridge along the string. This can be explained by acoustic resonance and microtonality. At harmonic nodal positions, the string resonates more than at other positions. For instance, dividing the string 1/3 + 2/3 creates a clear overtone, while 24/33 + 9/33 creates an indistinct overtone. The color dotted scale indicates the simple-number ratios up to the 7 limit (on the Moodswinger II to the 8 limit.)  On these positions just intoned harmonic dyads occur.

Tuning and scales
The Moodswinger is focused on a non-atonal playing technique. A mathematical scale is added to specify 23 harmonic positions on the strings. Because the instrument has 12 strings, tuned in a circle of fourths, it is always possible to play every note of the equal tempered scale. However some positions have a + or - indication, because the equal tempered scale is not a perfect well-tempered scale.

The tuning of this instrument is a circle of fourths: E-A-D-G-C-F-A#-D#-G#-C#-F#-B, arranged in 3 clusters of 4 strings each to make the field of strings better readable. 

Because of this tuning all five neighbouring strings form a harmonic pentatonic scale and all seven neighbouring strings form a major scale, available in every key. This allows a very easy fingerpicking technique without picking false notes, if the right key is chosen.

The instrument has 3 printed scales, used as guides for positioning the moveable third bridge and reading the played notes:
The normal guitar (equal-tempered) scale
An inverse scale (large steps between the frets at the top of the neck, small ones at the body bridge)
A microtonal scale which shows "logical" string divisions in the following color-coded groups:
Grey dot: 1/2
Red dot: 1/3+2/3
Orange dot: 1/4+3/4
Yellow dot: 1/5-4/5
Green dot: 1/6+5/6
Cyan dot: 1/7-6/7
And a smaller subscale for the higher-pitched overtones near the body bridge in colored lines:
Grey line: 1/8
Red line: 1/9
Orange line: 1/10
Yellow line: 1/11
Green line: 1/12
Blue line: 1/16

On the Moodswinger II the 1/8, 3/8, 5/8 and 7/8 are Blue dotted. On the Home Swinger the same color system occurs.

Moodswinger overtone diagram
The sound of a 3rd-bridged string is a combination of 3 tones. A soft-sounding attack tone of the string part hit at the body side, the corresponding overtone of both sides and a resonating low fundamental tone of the counterpart of the string at the head side.
The diagram below shows the tone combinations of the overtone (above) and the low tone of the counterpart (below). The attack tone is in most positions exact the same note as the overtone. Exceptions are 3/4, 3/5, 3/7 and 5/7. In the  3/... positions the overtone is a perfect fifth of the attack tone, in the 5/7 positions the overtone is a major third of the attack tone.

See also
Monochord

References

External links
Moodswinger on hypercustom.com

Experimental string instruments
Zithers
Dutch inventions